Horace Waller VC (23 September 1896 – 10 April 1917) was an English recipient of the Victoria Cross, the highest and most prestigious award for "gallantry in the face of the enemy" awarded to British and Commonwealth forces.

Biography
Waller was born 23 September 1896, in Batley Carr, Dewsbury, Yorkshire, to John Edward and Esther Waller, of Dewsbury, Yorkshire.

Waller was educated at Miss Whitworth’s Seminary, Dewsbury, Purlwell Council School, Batley Carr 1905–1909, Batley Grammar School from 1909–1913, and Dewsbury Technical College from 1913.  He was rejected for military service twice before enlisting at the age of 19 on 30 May 1916 and was sent to France in December 1916.

As a 20-year-old private in the 10th Service Battalion, The King's Own Yorkshire Light Infantry, British Army during the First World War, Waller was awarded a Victoria Cross for his valiant actions on 10 April 1917 south of Heninel, France. During the day, Waller continued for more than an hour to throw bombs and held off enemy attack. In the evening the enemy again counter-attacked and eventually killed Waller.

He is buried at Cojeul British Cemetery, Pas-de-Calais, France.

References

References
 
 

 

1896 births
1917 deaths
People from Dewsbury
King's Own Yorkshire Light Infantry soldiers
British Army personnel of World War I
British World War I recipients of the Victoria Cross
British military personnel killed in World War I
People educated at Batley Grammar School
British Army recipients of the Victoria Cross